William Artaud (1763–1823) was an English painter of portraits and biblical subjects.

Life
Artaud was the son of a London jeweller. He was awarded a premium at the Society of Arts in 1776, and first exhibited at the Royal Academy in 1780. He was a student at the Royal Academy Schools, winning a silver medal in 1783, the gold medal, (for a subject from Paradise Lost) in 1786, and the travelling studentship nine years later.

He painted both portraits and biblical subjects. His sitters included Francesco Bartolozzi, Samuel Parr (now in the collection of the Warwickshire Museum Service) Joseph Priestley, William Herschel and other leading figures of the day. Some of his biblical subjects were engraved for Macklin's Bible. The art historian Georg Kasper Nagler (1801–1866) gives a list of engravings after Artaud's paintings in his New General Dictionary of Artists.

He last exhibited at the Royal Academy in 1822. The date of his death is not known.

Samuel Redgrave said of him "his portraits were cleverly drawn, and painted with great power. They have individuality of character, but want expression."

References

Sources

Further reading
Albert Charles Sewter. The life, work and letters of William Artaud 1763–1823 (University of Manchester, 1951)

External links

William Artaud online (Artcyclopedia)
William Artaud Papers John Rylands Library, Manchester.

1763 births
1823 deaths
18th-century English painters
English male painters
19th-century English painters
English portrait painters
Painters from London
19th-century English male artists
18th-century English male artists